5 sormee is the second  solo studio album by Finnish musician Nopsajalka. Released on 9 March 2009, the album peaked at number 16 on the Finnish Albums Chart.

Track listing

Charts

Release history

References

2009 albums
Nopsajalka albums
Finnish-language albums